Yermoia is a genus of moths in the family Geometridae erected by James Halliday McDunnough in 1940.

Species
Yermoia perplexata McDunnough, 1940
Yermoia glaucina Rindge, 1961

References

Geometridae